Garde is a surname. It is also used as a masculine given name. Notable people with the surname include:

Surname
Adele De Garde (1899–1972), American actress
Betty Garde (1905–1989), American actress
François Garde (born 1959), French writer and civil servant
Giedo van der Garde (born 1985), Dutch race car driver
Gregory Garde (born 1949), Australian lawyer
Jørgen Garde (1939–1996), Danish admiral
Natanael Gärde (1880–1968), Swedish judge and politician
Rémi Garde (born 1966), French footballer
Thomas Vilhelm Garde (1859–1926), Danish naval officer and Arctic explorer
Zarah Garde-Wilson (born 1978), Australian solicitor

Given name
Garde Gardom (1924–2013), Canadian politician and lawyer

See also
 Daniel Vangarde (born 1947), French songwriter